Astoria is a placename, ultimately named for businessman John Jacob Astor (1763–1848), in the 1840s the wealthiest person in the United States and, as a hotel name, his great-grandson William Waldorf Astor (1848–1919).

The name was first used for Fort Astoria, built in 1811 at the mouth of the Columbia River (in what is now Oregon) for John Jacob Astor's Pacific Fur Company.

Places

United States 
 Astoria, Illinois (1837)
 Astoria Township, Fulton County, Illinois
 Astoria, Missouri (1844)
 Astoria, Queens, neighborhood in New York City (1839)
 Astoria, Oregon, named for Fort Astoria (1811) 
 Astoria, South Dakota (1900, named for Astoria, Oregon)

Other places 
 Astoria, Budapest, a major junction in central Budapest, named after the Astoria Grand Hotel at its corner
 Astoria (Budapest Metro)
 Astoria Boulevard, a boulevard in New York City
 Astoria Boulevard (BMT Astoria Line), a subway stop along the boulevard
 Astoria Canyon, a submarine abyss near the mouth of the Columbia River
 Astoria Park, a park located in Queens, New York.

Art, entertainment, and media 
 Astoria (book), an 1836 account of the founding of Astoria, Oregon by Washington Irving

Fictional entities 
 the wife of Muppet Show character Waldorf
 Astoria Greengrass, a minor character in the Harry Potter series
 a cartoon character from Dave Sim's Cerebus the Aardvark
 a country in Jura Soyfer's play Astoria

Music 
 Astoria (Tony Bennett album) 1990
 Astoria, a 2006 album by The Shys
 Astoria (Marianas Trench album) 2015

Edifices and enterprises 
 Astoria, Amsterdam, a Jugendstil Office building in Amsterdam
 Astoria, Stockholm, a cinema in Stockholm, Sweden
 Astoria Theatre, Brighton, a theatre in Brighton, England
 Coast Guard Air Station Astoria, a U.S. Coast Guard facility in Astoria, Oregon
 Fort Astoria, an historic fur trading station located in modern Astoria, Oregon
 London Astoria, a former music venue
 Kaufman Astoria Studios, a film and television studio in the Astoria neighborhood of Queens, New York City

Hotels 
 Hotel Astoria (Copenhagen), Denmark
 Hotel Astoria (Saint Petersburg), Russia
 Waldorf–Astoria (disambiguation)
 Danubius Hotel Astoria (Budapest), Hungary (1914)

Sports 
 Astoria Bydgoszcz, a sport association and basketball team in Bydgoszcz, Poland, established in 1924
 FC Astoria Walldorf, a German association football club from the town of Walldorf, Baden-Württemberg

Vessels 
 MS Astoria, a cruise ship broken up
 MV Astoria, a 1946 cruise ship to be broken up
 , a steamship
 USS Astoria, several U.S. Navy vessels
 MS Astoria Grande, cruise ship known as AIDAcara before
 Astoria (recording studio), David Gilmour's recording studio/houseboat

Other uses
 Astoria River, in Jasper National Park, Alberta, Canada
 "Astoria", a codename for ADO.NET Data Services

See also